Matheus Martins Silva (born December 8, 1996) is a Brazilian footballer who plays as a defender.

Career
Silva signed with Major League Soccer club San Jose Earthquakes on July 15, 2015. He made his professional debut on March 6, 2016 as an injury time substitute during a 1-0 victory over Colorado Rapids. Silva was loaned to Arizona United SC on May 13, 2016, Silva was again loaned out to San Jose's USL affiliate Reno 1868 FC in March 2017.

Silva was released by San Jose on 27 November 2017.

Silva signed with United Soccer League side Swope Park Rangers on 5 January 2018.

In 2019, Silva signed with the newly-reformed Orlando City B as they contested the inaugural USL League One season. He made his debut for the team on April 19 in a 2–1 defeat to Forward Madison. After OCB's season ended, Silva joined Miami FC for their inaugural season in the National Independent Soccer Association.

On January 13, 2020, it was announced that Silva had signed with Hartford Athletic for the 2020 season.

Silva moved back to Brazil with Figueirense in March 2021, but it was announced at the end of the season he would be released by the club.

Silva returned to the United States on 11 January 2022, signing a one-year deal with USL Championship side FC Tulsa. He was released by Tulsa following the 2022 season.

Lake Tahoe incident
On 4 July 2017, Silva had to be pulled out of the water while swimming in Lake Tahoe. After receiving life-saving resuscitation measures at the scene, he was transferred to a nearby hospital in Lake Tahoe. He was later airlifted to Renown Regional Medical Center in Reno, where he was described as being in a  "critical, but stable condition". On 6 July 2017, Silva awoke from his coma and was described as "fully responsive". San Jose captain Chris Wondolowski honored Silva by wearing his number, 38, on his jersey during the U.S. Open Cup quarterfinal match against the LA Galaxy on July 10; Wondolowski scored a brace while wearing Silva's number to lead the team to a 3-2 victory.

References

External links
 
 

1996 births
Living people
Brazilian footballers
Brazilian expatriate sportspeople in the United States
San Jose Earthquakes players
Association football midfielders
Major League Soccer players
Expatriate soccer players in the United States
Phoenix Rising FC players
USL Championship players
Reno 1868 FC players
Sporting Kansas City II players
Orlando City B players
USL League One players
National Independent Soccer Association players
Hartford Athletic players
Miami FC players
Montverde Academy alumni
Figueirense FC players
FC Tulsa players
Brazilian expatriate footballers
People from Taboão da Serra